An F3 tornado struck the town of Bouctouche, New Brunswick on Wednesday, August 6, 1879.

It is estimated that the tornado was an F3 in strength, and is the easternmost significant tornado in North America, though weaker tornadoes and waterspouts have been known to form across Nova Scotia, Prince Edward Island and rarely in Newfoundland and Labrador.

The tornado initially started in the Sainte-Marie Parish, New Brunswick around 1:00 PM AST before moving eastward towards Mill Creek, New Brunswick. As the tornado entered the town, it destroyed upwards of 100 buildings, including the Bouctouche Church. The tornado missed the St Mary's Church and the Presbyterian Church. As the tornado approached the coast, it destroyed various dwellings and shops near the ship-yard. The bridge that crosses Bouctouche River in the town was also destroyed alongside the new school. 

The number of people killed in the tornado ranges depending on the source, however, the general number ranges from five to eight fatalities with the tornado injuring many. In addition to the number of people injured and killed, the amount of destroyed dwellings resulted in many being homeless.

The damage costs were estimated around $100,000 USD, which was a very high figure at the time.

See also 
 List of Canadian tornadoes and tornado outbreaks

References

External links 
 Environment Canada's information page on Tornadoes (Alternate Link)
 Canadian Atlas of strong tornadoes
 List of strong tornadoes from 1879 to present
 Dan, Dan, The Weather Man's webpage of Canadian Weather Events
 Contemporary newspaper article about the tornado
 Weather Events: Canada's Deadliest Tornadoes

Tornadoes of 1879
Natural disasters in New Brunswick
Kent County, New Brunswick
Tornadoes in Canada
1879 in Canada
Bouctouche
1879 in New Brunswick
August 1879 events
Tornadoes in Canada by date